Queen's Daughters is a religious and charitable society that was founded at St. Louis, Missouri, on December 5, 1889, by Mary Hoxsey, widow of Benjamin W. Hoxsey of Paterson. It was organized to supplement the work done for the poor in their homes by the members of the Society of Saint Vincent de Paul. Several years later, the papal sanction and blessing were accorded (July 17, 1894). The society since spread to numerous parishes of the United States and around 1910 there were thirty-five associations affiliated to those at St. Louis.

References

 APA citation. Kelly, B.M. (1914). Queen's Daughters. In The Catholic Encyclopedia. New York: The Encyclopedia Press. Retrieved October 27, 2022 from New Advent.
 MLA citation. Kelly, Blanche Mary. "Queen's Daughters." The Catholic Encyclopedia. Vol. 16 (Index). New York: The Encyclopedia Press, 1914. 27 Oct. 2022.
 Transcription. This article was transcribed for New Advent by Douglas J. Potter. Dedicated to the Immaculate Heart of the Blessed Virgin Mary.

Charities based in Missouri
Religious charities based in the United States
1889 establishments in Missouri